Yaara is a 2020 Indian Hindi-language crime action film directed by Tigmanshu Dhulia. The film stars Vidyut Jammwal, Shruti Haasan, Amit Sadh, Vijay Varma, Kenny Basumatary and Ankur Vikal. Co-produced by Tigmanshu Dhulia Films and Azure Entertainment, it is an official remake of the 2011 French film A Gang Story and follows a gang of former criminals that reunites after several years to rescue a friend arrested by the police.

Initially scheduled to release theatrically, Yaara premiered digitally through ZEE5 on 30 July 2020. The film received mixed reviews, who appreciated the performances, and action sequences, but was criticized for the screenplay, pace, and Dhulia's direction.

Plot 
When a criminal named Mitwa is arrested by police, his friends Phagun, Rizwan and Bahadur decide to help him. In the police station, Mitwa reminisces of his days with his friends when they were young; Phagun and Mitwa came to be raised together by a man named Chand in Jaisalmer during the early 1950s. When a gun made by Chand was used to kill a criminal's brother, he shot himself in order to save Phagun and Mitwa, who teamed up to burn down the criminal's house and flew away. At the India–Nepal border, a man named Chaman recruited them as members of the Chaukdi Gang along with Rizwan and Bahadur. Together, they became friends and grew up as professional smugglers dealing with goods between India and Nepal. One day, a powerful criminal assigned the gang and his trusted aide Fakira to go to Patna and rob a bank but make it look like an act of naxalites. After the heist, a shootout with cops left Chaman dead, and the vengeful gang killed the criminal and his henchmen. Fakira joined the gang, promising to be a loyal friend. The five then helped some villagers by beating up a corrupt landlord and providing them food, following which they bought a piece of land for their activities.

Back to the present, JCP Jasjit Singh meets Phagun, Rizwan, and Bahadur to inform them about Mitwa's capture. Sukanya, Phagun's wife, doesn't want him to get involved, but Phagun is adamant about helping Mitwa and gets him rescued with the help of Tanuja's abusive husband Madan and two other men who are later killed. Mitwa later reveals a petty case landed him into prison for 6 months, and his pregnant girlfriend Tanuja married Madan. A criminal and former partner named Shakeel is after him because Mitwa, who worked for the Romania-based Durrani, felt underpaid and ran away after stealing money. Phagun later arrives home to find an effigy inscribed with a message to hand over Mitwa. Another flashback explains how Sukanya got involved with the gang; she used to be a college student working for a political movement, and the gang supplied guns. They fell for each other after Phagun fought off corrupt cops to save Sukanya and an injured party member. The gang later went to Sukanya's village, but Fakira left earlier, and during the night, the gang ended up in a shootout with the cops that resulted in the gang's torture and arrest. Rizwan and Bahadur were sentenced for 7 years each, Mitwa was sentenced for 4 years, and Phagun, 10 years. After one year, Sukanya met him and revealed she was also arrested but left after being raped. They got married after Phagun was released and reunited with Rizwan and Bahadur. The gang suspected Fakira as well as Mitwa, who started working for Shakeel and had left behind a 2-year-old son with Tanuja in Delhi. Following his marriage, Phagun started a land business.

Back to the present, the gang is worried and decides to keep Tanuja at Bahadur's house along with her son Tinku, where Shakeel arrives and kills Tanuja and Bahadur. The gang learns about this from Jasjit and kills Shakeel by luring him into a trap with the help of Rizwan's lover. Jasjit thanks Phagun for taking out Shakeel but still wants him to hand over Mitwa. Later, while going to a marriage function, Sukanya reveals Tinku spoke of the killers talking to Durrani, which worries Phagun. At the function, an assassin shoots Rizwan and his married girlfriend, Sonya, in the restroom. Willing to end the conflict, Phagun flies to Romania to meet Durrani, and finds out its none other than Fakira. Phagun kills him with a sharpened credit card and fights off his guards before escaping back to India. He meets privately with Jasjit and learns it was Mitwa who gave the gang's names to the police and eventually, served the shortest sentence. Phagun then meets Mitwa and tells him he knows of his betrayal. However, he still hands over him the passport and tickets along with a gun, before Jasjit arrives with his team to arrest a guilt-ridden Mitwa who shoots himself. Back home, Phagun sees Tinku playing piano with Arjun (Phagun and Sukanya's son).

Cast 
 Vidyut Jammwal as Phagun Gadoriya aka Paramveer
 Shruti Haasan as Sukanya
 Amit Sadh as Mubharak Shehriya aka Mitwa
 Vijay Varma as Rizwan Sheikh
 Kenny Basumatary as Bhimsen Thapa aka Bahadur
 Mohommed Ali Shah as Jasjit Singh
 Sanjay Mishra as Chaman
 Ankur Vikal as Fakira / Durrani
 Shreya Narayan as Tanuja
 Mariska Pokharel
 Rajiv Gupta as Magistrate Nand Kishore Verma

Soundtrack 

The film's music was composed by Gourov-Roshin, Shaan, Ankit Tiwari and Siddharth Pandit, while lyrics were written by Prashant Ingole, Sunil Sirvaiya, Manoj Muntashir and Rev Shergill.

Release 
Yaara premiered through ZEE5 on 30 July 2020. Initially intended for theatrical release, this was dropped in favour of a digital release due to the COVID-19 pandemic resulting in theatres being closed.

References

External links 

2020 direct-to-video films
2020 films
2020 crime action films
2020s Hindi-language films
Films about criminals
Films about friendship
Films not released in theaters due to the COVID-19 pandemic
Films set in Nepal
Films shot in Kathmandu
Films shot in Nepal
Indian crime action films
Indian remakes of French films
ZEE5 original films